This is a listing of the horses that finished in either first, second, or third place and the number of starters in the discontinued Donn Handicap, an American Grade 1 race for three-year-olds at 1-1/8 miles on the dirt at Gulfstream Park in Hallandale, Florida.  (List 1973–present)

References 

General
 The Donn Handicap at Pedigree Query
 The Donn Handicap at the NTRA

Gulfstream Park
Lists of horse racing results

ja:ドンハンデキャップ